This is an alphabetical list of Canadian women government ministers.

Canadian women government ministers

 Diane Ablonczy
 Sophia Aggelonitis – served as Ontario's Minister of Revenue and Minister Responsible for Seniors in the Liberal government of Premier Dalton McGuinty.
 Leona Aglukkaq
 Zanana Akande
 Nancy Allan
 Rona Ambrose
 Suzanne Anton
 Jean Augustine
 Becky Barrett
 Isabel Bassett
 Louise Beaudoin
 Monique Bégin
 Carolyn Bennett – was appointed as the Minister of Indigenous and Northern Affairs in the present Cabinet, headed by Justin Trudeau, on November 4, 2015. 
 Candice Bergen
 Margarett Best
 Marie-Claude Bibeau
 Margaret Birch
 Shirley Bond
 Marie Bountrogianni
 Marion Boyd
 Claudette Bradshaw
 Erna Braun
 Laurel Broten
 Stephanie Cadieux
 Donna Cansfield
 Elinor Caplan
 Aileen Carroll
 Jenny Carter
 Bardish Chagger
 Mary Anne Chambers
 Ida Chong
 Marilyn Churley
 Mary Collins
 Shirley Collins
 Shirley Coppen
 Sheila Copps
 Deanne Crothers – elected to the Legislative Assembly of Manitoba in the 2011 election, she represents the electoral district of St. James as a member of the Manitoba New Democratic Party caucus. On November 3, 2014 she was named minister of healthy living and seniors.
 Dianne Cunningham
 Dipika Damerla
 Caroline Di Cocco
 Leona Dombrowsky
 Kirsty Duncan
 Janet Ecker
 Brenda Elliott
 Ellen Fairclough
 Kerry-Lynne Findlay
 Diane Finley
 Susan Fish
 Judy Foote
 Chrystia Freeland
 Jean Friesen
 Monique Gagnon-Tremblay
 Evelyn Gigantes
 Shelly Glover
 Ruth Grier
 Helena Guergis
 Patty Hajdu
 Christine Hart
 Karen Haslam
 Chaviva Hošek
 Jennifer Howard
 Mitzie Hunter
 Olga Ilich
 Kerri Irvin-Ross
 Helena Jaczek
 Linda Jeffrey
 Monique Jérôme-Forget
 Helen Johns
 Mélanie Joly
 Marie-France Lalonde
 Frances Lankin
 Diane Lebouthillier
 Marjory LeBreton
 Kellie Leitch
 Tracy MacCharles
 Margaret MacDiarmid
 Flor Marcelino
 Shelley Martel
 Shirley Martin
 Deb Matthews
 Barbara McDougall
 Diane McGifford
 Catherine McKenna – appointed as Minister of  Environment and Climate Change in the  Cabinet, headed by Justin Trudeau, on November 4, 2015.
 Anne McLellan
 Lyn McLeod
 Mary McNeil
 Madeleine Meilleur
 Christine Melnick
 MaryAnn Mihychuk
 Carol Mitchell
 Maryam Monsef
 Joyce Murray
 Marilyn Mushinski
 Coralee Oakes
 Bev Oda
 Lily Oddie
 Theresa Oswald
 Jane Philpott – appointed as Canada's Minister of Health on November 4, 2015.
 Teresa Piruzza
 Mary Polak
 Sandra Pupatello
 Carla Qualtrough
 Lisa Raitt
 Michelle Rempel
 Lucienne Robillard
 Cathy Rogers
 Liz Sandals
 Deb Schulte
 Margaret Scrivener
 Erin Selby
 Gail Shea
 Carol Skelton
 Elizabeth Joan Smith
 Bette Stephenson
 Christine Stewart
 Jane Stewart
 Michelle Stilwell
 Moira Stilwell
 Anne Swarbrick
 Carole Taylor
 Josée Verner
 Shelley Wark-Martyn
 Teresa Wat – represents the electoral district of Richmond Centre as a member of the British Columbia Liberal Party and was appointed Minister of International Trade, and Minister Responsible for the Asia Pacific Strategy and Multiculturalism on June 10, 2013 by Premier Christy Clark.
 Susan Whelan
 Melanie Wight
 Jody Wilson-Raybould
 Mavis Wilson
 Elizabeth Witmer
 Alice Wong
 Teresa Woo-Paw
 Rosann Wowchuk
 Kathleen Wynne
 Naomi Yamamoto
 Lynne Yelich
 Elaine Ziemba

See also

 List of female first ministers in Canada
 List of female viceroys in Canada
 List of elected or appointed female heads of state
 List of female prime ministers
 Women in Canadian politics

References

Women government ministers
Government ministers
Ministers